Copenhagen House Grounds in Islington, London also known as the 'Old Cope' was opened 24 September 1850 and was the leading venue for professional athletics until it closed in December 1853 after severe storm damage.  Initially consisting of a 200-yard straight, an oval gravel track was added, opening on 17 March 1851, thought to be one third of a mile in length, enclosing a cricket pitch.

One of the first world records for the mile was set there; Charles Westhall in 4:28 on 26 July 1852.

Whilst much of the site has been built upon, Caledonian Park is a remnant.

References
 runtrackdir.com, Peter Lovesey
 Caledonian Park

Former buildings and structures in the London Borough of Islington